Kim Dae-eun (Hangul: 김대은; born 1 October 1990) is a South Korean badminton player who affiliated with Yonex team since 2013. He graduated from Wonkwang University.

Achievements

BWF World Junior Championships 
Boys' doubles

BWF International Challenge/Series 
Men's doubles

  BWF International Challenge tournament
  BWF International Series tournament
  BWF Future Series tournament

References

External links 
 

1990 births
Living people
South Korean male badminton players